The Gorgona Group (named after the mythological creature Gorgon), was a Croatian avant-garde art group which consisted of artists and art historians. The group, made up of Dimitrije Bašičević-Mangelos, Miljenko Horvat, Marijan Jevšovar, Julije Knifer, Ivan Kožarić, Matko Meštrović, Radoslav Putar, Đuro Seder, operated along the lines of anti-art in Zagreb between 1959 and 1966. Beside individual works linked to traditional techniques, the members proposed different concepts and forms of artistic communication, ran a gallery, and published the "anti-magazine" Gorgona. In each issue, they featured one artist's work such as Dieter Roth or Julije Knifer. Works by the Gorgona Group are widely represented in a number of institutions in Croatia, including the Museum of Contemporary Art, Zagreb, the Filip Trade Collection, and the Marinko Sudac Collection.

Selected exhibitions and participations of the group

1977 "Gorgona", Gallery of Contemporary Art, Zagreb; Municipal Museum, Mönchengladbach; Gallery ·KUC, Belgrade
1981 São Paulo Art Biennial
1986 Gallery ·KUC, Belgrade
1989 "Gorgona", FRAC Bourgogne, Art Plus University, Dijon
1993 "The Horse Who Sings - Radical Art from Croatia", Museum of Contemporary Art, Sydney
1997 "Gorgona, Gorgonesco, Gorgonico", Venice Biennale

External links
 Mangelos
 Mangelos 2

Neo-Dada
Art movements
Modern art
Conceptual art
Croatian art
Croatian artist groups and collectives